Ralph Blakelock (born Leeds 1803 died Gimingham 1892) was Archdeacon of Norfolk from 1869 until 1874.

Nevill was educated at Giggleswick School and St Catharine's College, Cambridge. He was ordained in 1832 and was Rector of Gimingham from 1833 until his death on 1 March 1892.

Notes

1803 births
Clergy from Leeds
1892 deaths
19th-century English Anglican priests
People educated at Giggleswick School
Archdeacons of Norfolk
Alumni of St Catharine's College, Cambridge